The following lists events that happened during 2001 in New Zealand.

Population
 Estimated population as of 31 December: 3,916,200
 Increase since 31 December 2000: 43,100 (1.11%)
 Males per 100 Females: 96.2

Incumbents

Regal and viceregal
Head of State – Elizabeth II
Governor-General – The Rt Hon. Sir Michael Hardie Boys GNZM, GCMG, QSO followed by The Hon Dame Silvia Cartwright PCNZM, DBE, QSO

Government
The 46th New Zealand Parliament continued. Government was The Labour Party led by Helen Clark, in coalition with Alliance, led by Jim Anderton.

Speaker of the House – Jonathan Hunt
Prime Minister – Helen Clark
Deputy Prime Minister – Jim Anderton
Minister of Finance – Michael Cullen
Minister of Foreign Affairs – Phil Goff
Chief Justice — Sian Elias

Opposition leaders

See: :Category:Parliament of New Zealand, :New Zealand elections

National – TBD (Leader of the Opposition)
Greens – Jeanette Fitzsimons and Rod Donald
Act – TBD
New Zealand First – TBD
United Future – TBD
Māori Party – TBD
Labour – TBD
Progressives – TBD
United Future – TBD

Main centre leaders
Mayor of Auckland – Christine Fletcher then John Banks
Mayor of Hamilton – Russell Matthew Remmington then David Braithwaite
Mayor of Wellington – Mark Blumsky then Kerry Prendergast
Mayor of Christchurch – Garry Moore
Mayor of Dunedin – Sukhi Turner

Events
 New Zealand establishes an embassy in Brasília, Brazil.

Arts and literature
Jo Randerson wins the Robert Burns Fellowship.
Montana New Zealand Book Awards:
Montana Medal: Michael King, Wrestling with the Angel: A Life of Janet Frame
Deutz Medal: Lloyd Jones, The Book of Fame
Reader's Choice: Michael King, Wrestling with the Angel: A Life of Janet Frame
First Book Awards
Fiction: Karyn Hay, Emerald Budgies
Poetry: Stephanie de Montalk, Animals Indoors
Non-Fiction: Paul Tapsell, Pukaki: A Comet Returns

See 2001 in art, 2001 in literature, :Category:2001 books

Music

New Zealand Music Awards
Two original categories were retired 'Most Promising Male Vocalist' and 'Most Promising Female Vocalist' and the 'Film Soundtrack/Cast Recording/Compilation' category introduced the year before was reduced to be compilations only.
Winners are shown first with nominees underneath.
 Album of the Year: Zed – Silencer
Dave Dobbyn – Hopetown
Fur Patrol – Pet
Tadpole – The Buddhafinger'
Tim Finn / Dave Dobbyn / Bic Runga – Together in Concert: Live
 Single of the Year: Fur Patrol – Lydia
Eye TV – "One Day Ahead"
Shihad – Pacifier
Tadpole – Alright
Zed – Renegade Fighter
 Top Group: Zed – Silencer
Tadpole – The Buddhafinger
Shihad – Pacifier
 Best New Act: Betchadupa
Splitter
Dan Sperber & Luke Casey
 Top Male Vocalist: Nathan King (Zed)
Jon Toogood (Shihad)
Dave Dobbyn
 Top Female Vocalist: Julia Deans (Fur Patrol)
Renee Brennan (Tadpole)
Libby Huirua
 Best Folk Album: Lothlorien – Greenwood Side
Run The Cutter – Passing Time
The Jews Brothers Band – My Yiddish Swing
 Best Jazz Album: The Rodger Fox Big Band – Ain't That The Truth
Erna Ferry – Devil May Care
Chris Mason Bentley Group – Karakia
 Best Classical Album: Strike – New Zealand Percussion Music
Michael Houston – Elusive Dreams: NZ Piano Music
New Zealand String Quartet – Gareth Farr: Owhiro
 Best Country Album: no award
 Best Gospel Album: The Parachute Band – Love
Solace – Solace
Invasion Band – Nga Mea Katoa
 Best Mana Maori Album: Wai – Wai 100%
Ruia & Ranea – Whare Maori
Big Belly Woman – Dance with the Wind
 Best Mana Reo Album: Whirimako Black -Shrouded in The Mist / Hinepukohurangi
Ruia & Ranea – Whare Maori
Wai – Wai 100%
 Best Children's Album: Liam Ryan & Carol Storey – The Present
Kids Music Company Singers – On A High Note
John Phillips – The Lost Property Box
 Best Compilation: Strawpeople – The Best of 1990–2000
HLAH – Blood on the Honky Tonk Floor
Various – Algorhythm 2
 Best Songwriter: Julia Deans – Lydia (Fur Patrol)
Aaron Takona – Calling On (Weta)
Nathan King – Renegade Fighter (Zed)
 Best Producer: Dave Long – Pet (Fur Patrol)
Malcolm Welsford – The Buddhafinger (Tadpole)
Paul Casserly & Joost Langeveld – No New Messages (Strawpeople)
 Best Engineer: Sam Gibson – Betchadupa EP (Betchadupa)
Malcolm Welsford – The Buddhafinger (Tadpole)
Mike Gibson – Pet (Fur Patrol)
 Best Video: Alex Sutherland & Michael Lonsdale – Touchdown (The Stereobus)
Greg Page – "One Day Ahead" (Eye TV)
Wade Shotter & Jamie Dower – Silent Film (Augustino)
 Best Cover: Wayne Conway – Hopetown (Dave Dobbyn)
Monique Facon – The Buddhafinger (Tadpole)
Andrew B White & Jade Weaver – Pet (Fur Patrol)
 New Zealand Radio Programmer Award: Rodger Clamp – More FM Auckland & Channel Z
Andi Dawkins – More FM Christchurch and Dunedin
Brad King – The Rock Network
 Outstanding International Achievement: Shihad
Deep Obsession
Salmonella Dub

See: 2001 in music, New Zealand Top 50 Albums of 2001

Performing arts

 Benny Award presented by the Variety Artists Club of New Zealand to Gray Bartlett MBE.

Radio and television
See: 2001 in New Zealand television, 2001 in television, List of TVNZ television programming, :Category:Television in New Zealand, TV3 (New Zealand), :Category:New Zealand television shows, Public broadcasting in New Zealand

Film
Crooked Earth
The Lord of the Rings: The Two Towers

See: :Category:2001 film awards, 2001 in film, List of New Zealand feature films, Cinema of New Zealand, :Category:2001 films

Internet

See: NZ Internet History

Sport
 See: 2001 in sports, :Category:2001 in sports

Athletics
Alastair Snowdon wins his first national title in the men's marathon, clocking 2:22:12 on 3 June in Christchurch, while Anne Clarke claims her first as well in the women's championship (2:47:55).

Basketball
 The Men's National Basketball League was won by the Waikato Titans who beat the Wellington Saints 112–97 in the final, the Titans having finished top of the league with 15/16 wins.
 The Women’s National Basketball League was won by the Wellington Swish

Cricket
New Zealand cricket team
The State Championship was won by the Wellington Firebirds

Golf
 New Zealand Open, :Category:New Zealand golfers in overseas tournaments.

Horse racing

Harness racing
 New Zealand Trotting Cup: Kym's Girl
 Auckland Trotting Cup: Holmes D G

Thoroughbred racing

Netball
Silver Ferns
National Bank Cup

Rugby league
 Bartercard Cup won by the Hibiscus Coast Raiders who were also the minor premiers
 The New Zealand Warriors cane 8th of 14 teams in the NRL, qualifying for the playoffs for the first time. They were knocked out in the first round by minor premiers, Parramatta Eels, 56–12.

Rugby union
 The Super 12 competition was won by the Brumbies, the first win by a non-NZ team. No NZ teams made the semifinals.
 National Provincial Championship: Division 1, Canterbury, Division 2: Hawke's Bay, Division 3: South Canterbury
 the Bledisloe Cup was won by Australia who won both games.
 the Tri Nations Series was won by Australia, with two wins and a draw. New Zealand came second with two wins.
 The Ranfurly Shield was held by Canterbury all season, with successful defences against Buller 69-3 (in Westport), Sth Canterbury 103-0	(in Timaru), Nelson Bays 67–10, Bay of Plenty 72–3, Wellington 31–29, Taranaki 38–17, Auckland 38–10, Waikato 52-19

Shooting
Ballinger Belt – Murray Steele (Malvern)

Soccer
 The New Zealand National Soccer League was relaunched as a winter competition with 10 teams and finals playoffs. The winner was Napier City Rovers.
 The Chatham Cup is won by University - Mount Wellington who beat Central United 3–3 in the final (5-4 on penalties).

Births

January–March
 3 January – Chay Fihaki, rugby union player
 4 January – Ally Wollaston, racing cyclist
 11 January – Corey Evans, rugby union player
 15 January – Tiana Metuarau, netball player
 17 January – Josh Lord, rugby union player
 18 January – Kanah Andrews-Nahu, weightlifter
 28 January – TK Howden, rugby union player
 1 February – Sean Withy, rugby union player
 6 February – Peter Vodanovich, racing driver
 9 February – Eve Thomas, swimmer
 14 February
 Mat Feagai, rugby league player
 Max Feagai, rugby league player
 15 February – Reuben Thompson, racing cyclist
 1 March
 Griffin Neame, rugby league player
 Kaitlyn Watts, squash player
 6 March – Zoi Sadowski-Synnott, snowboarder
 22 March – Cortez Ratima, rugby union player
 27 March – Valentina Ivanov, tennis player

April–June
 24 April – Simi Sasagi, rugby league player
 28 April – Ruben Love, rugby union player
 8 May – Edward Osei-Nketia, athlete
 11 May – Kaleb Ngatoa, racing driver
 17 May – Rocco Berry, rugby league player
 23 May – Olivia Shannon, field hockey player
 24 May – Chante Temara, rugby league player
 25 May – Corey Kellow, rugby union player
 7 June – Aidan Morgan, rugby union player
 11 June – Ben Waine, association footballer
 14 June – Maggie Jenkins, association footballer
 15 June
 Chelsey Edwards, swimmer
 Tupou Neiufi, swimmer
 Molly Penfold, cricketer
 George Stoupe, tennis player
 20 June – Elys Ventura, tennis player
 21 June – Connor Bell, discus thrower
 22 June – Amelia Abbott, association footballer
 26 June – Anna Leat, association footballer

July–September
 1 July – Soane Vikena, rugby union player
 7 July – Gabi Rennie, association footballer
 12 July – Dominic Gardiner, rugby union player
 26 July – Gideon Wrampling, rugby union player
 27 July – Maiakawanakaulani Roos, rugby union player
 30 July – Dee Heslop, Australian rules footballer
 3 August – Jacob Ratumaitavuki-Kneepkens, rugby union player
 16 August – Danielle Aitchison, para-athlete
 22 August – Jackson Topine, rugby league player
 4 September – Zach Gallagher, rugby union player
 10 September – Maddison Weatherall, rugby league player
 11 September
 Katie Doar, field hockey player
 El Segundo, Thoroughbred racehorse
 17 September – Manu Paea, rugby union player

October–December
 11 October – Vaiolini Ekuasi, rugby union player
 13 October – Ben Harrington, freestyle skier
 22 October – George Ott, association footballer
 27 October – Alec MacDonald, rugby league player
 9 November – Jock McKenzie, rugby union player
 14 November
 Galleons Sunset, Standardbred racehorse
 TC Robati, rugby league player
 23 November – Nico Porteous, freestyle skier
 29 November – Xcellent, Thoroughbred racehorse
 1 December – Alice Robinson, alpine skier
 5 December – Sean Findlay, field hockey player
 10 December – Sam Sutton, association footballer
 21 December – Finn Fisher-Black, racing cyclist
 24 December – Tukimihia Simpkins, rugby league player

Deaths

January–March
 13 January – William Fraser, politician (born 1924)
 30 January – Jean Coulston, cricketer (born 1934)
 1 February
 Roy Dalgarno, artist (born 1910)
 Sir Robert Mahuta, Māori leader (born 1939)
 4 February – Sir David Beattie, jurist, Governor-General (1980–85) (born 1924)
 27 February – Selwyn Toogood, radio and television personality (born 1916)
 4 March – Herbert Green, obstetrician and gynaecologist (born 1916)

April–June
 8 April – Elsie Locke, writer, historian and activist (born 1912)
 10 April
 Nyree Dawn Porter, actor (born 1936)
 Red Anchor, Thoroughbred racehorse (foaled 1981)
 11 April – Sir Thaddeus McCarthy, jurist (born 1907)
 20 April – Bert Sutcliffe, cricketer (born 1923)
 22 April – Trevor de Cleene, politician (born 1933)
 24 April – Lindsay Daen, sculptor and artist (born 1923)
 5 May – Roger Hill, World War II naval commander (born 1910)
 18 May – Sir Alan Westerman, public servant (born 1913)
 19 May
 Sir Alan Hellaby, businessman (born 1926)
 Harry Mahon, rowing coach (born 1942)
 21 May
 Erkin Bairam, economics academic (born 1958)
 Cecil Murgatroyd, non-serious politician (born 1958)
 2 June – Sir Kenneth Hayr, RAF air marshal (born 1935) 
 6 June – Douglas Lilburn, composer (born 1915)
 8 June – Duncan MacIntyre, politician (born 1915)
 13 June – Gordon Christie, politician (born 1914)
 20 June – Wallace Reyburn, writer (born 1913)
 30 June – Jack Finlay, rugby union player and coach, soldier (born 1916)

July–September
 4 July – Charlie Saxton, rugby union player, cricketer (born 1913)
 6 July – Derek Freeman, anthropologist (born 1916)
 8 July – John O'Shea, filmmaker and actor (born 1920)
 18 July – Ritchie Johnston, cyclist (born 1931)
 19 July
 Charles King, cyclist (born 1911)
 Peter Lucas, rower (born 1933)
 25 July
 Levi Borgstrom, wood carver (born 1919)
 Alan Kirton, agricultural scientist (born 1933)
 27 July
 George Cholmondeley-Tapper, motor racing driver (born 1910)
 Van der Hum, Thoroughbred racehorse (foaled 1971)
 30 July – Thomas Wells, cricketer and educator (born 1927)
 5 August
 Kenelm Digby, lawyer, jurist, public servant (born 1912)
 Patricia Woodroffe, fencer (born 1926)
 7 August – Dick Dunn, boxing coach (born 1908)
 8 August
 Robin Penhearow, cricketer (born 1941)
 Peter Sinclair, radio and television personality (born 1938)
 25 August – Bill Pratney, cyclist and politician (born 1909)
 1 September – Sir John Robertson, ombudsman (born 1925)
 31 August – Rex Forrester, hunter and fisherman (born 1928)
 21 September – Andrew Bradfield, computer programmer (born 1966)
 23 September – Allen Curnow, poet and journalist (born 1911)
 28 September – Jack Skeen, rugby union player (born 1928)
 29 September – Shona McFarlane, artist, journalist and television personality (born 1929)

October–December
 8 October – Ray Williams, rugby union player (born 1909)
 10 October – Norm Wilson, rugby union player and television personality (born 1922)
 14 October – Sir Philip Adams, diplomat (born 1915)
 22 October – Bill James, rower (born 1926)
 26 October – John Platts-Mills, politician (born 1906)
 30 October − Jack Scott, politician (born 1916)
 6 November – Peter Newman, economist (born 1928)
 10 November – Enid McElwee, fencer (born 1914)
 13 November
 Jack Griffiths, rugby union player, soldier (born 1912)
 Mayzod Reid, diver (born 1928)
 6 December – Sir Peter Blake, yachtsman (born 1948)
 13 December – Pamela Barham, netball player and coach
 14 December – Reg Singer, association football player (born 1924)
 20 December
 Manuhuia Bennett – Anglican bishop (born 1916)
 Dame Miraka Szászy, Māori leader (born 1921)
 29 December – Brian Bansgrove, film gaffer (born 1941)

See also
List of years in New Zealand
Timeline of New Zealand history
History of New Zealand
Military history of New Zealand
Timeline of the New Zealand environment
Timeline of New Zealand's links with Antarctica

References

 
New Zealand
New Zealand
2000s in New Zealand
Years of the 21st century in New Zealand